Sara J. Schechner (born 1957) is an American historian of science, the David P. Wheatland Curator of the Collection of Historical Scientific Instruments and a lecturer on the History of Science at Harvard University.

Life
Schechner earned her Bachelor of Arts in History and Science with Physics from Harvard-Radcliffe of Harvard University, graduating summa cum laude in 1979. She then studied History and Philosophy of Science at the Emmanuel College of the Cambridge University and finished it with a Master of Philosophy in 1981. She completed her artium magister (Master of Arts) on the History of Science at the Harvard University in 1982. In 1988, she finalized her PhD on the History of Science at the Harvard University.

Afterwards, Schechner was chief curator at the Adler Planetarium in Chicago. She also curated exhibits for the Smithsonian Institution, the American Astronomical Society, and the American Physical Society. In 2000, she returned to Harvard University as the David P. Wheatland Curator of the Collection of Historical Scientific Instruments. She is also a lecturer on the History of Science at Harvard University.

Selected publications

Awards
 2020: Elected a Legacy Fellow of the American Astronomical Society in 2020.
 2019: Paul Bunge Prize of the Society of German Chemists
 2018: LeRoy E. Doggett Prize, American Astronomical Society
 2018: Second Place, Telescopes-Mechanical/Other, Stellafane Convention, for a quilt, “This is Stellafane!” 2018.
 2014: Great Exhibitions Prize for Body of Knowledge:A History of Anatomy (in 3 Parts), British Society for the History of Science
 2014: Dean's Impact Award, Faculty of Arts and Sciences, Harvard University
 2010: The Paul and Irene Hollister Lecturer on Glass, 2010.
 2009: First Place, Telescopes-Mechanical/Special, Stellafane Convention, for a historical quilt,“The Great 26-Inch Telescope at Foggy Bottom,”
 2008: Joseph H. Hazen Education Prize.
 2007: First Place, International Design Awards 2007, for Time, Life, & Matter
 2004: Helen Sawyer Hogg Public Lecturer, Royal Astronomical Society of Canada
 1991–1992: Herbert C. Pollock Award
 From 1982: New York Academy of Sciences
 From 1979: Sigma Xi
 1979: Sigma Xi Prize, Harvard
 1979: Phi Beta Kappa, Harvard

References

1957 births
Living people
Alumni of Emmanuel College, Cambridge
American historians
Radcliffe College alumni
Fellows of the American Astronomical Society
American women historians
21st-century American women